Corey Richard Davis Jr. (born June 4, 1997) is an American professional basketball player for Pallacanestro Trieste of the Italian Lega Basket Serie A (LBA). He played college basketball for the Houston Cougars.

Early life and high school
Davis competed at Lafayette High School under coach Clifton Brown. As a senior, he averaged 14 points, nine rebounds, four assists and two blocks per game. Davis led the team to a 26–4 record and District 3-5A championship, though the team lost to Parkway High School 69–68 in the state semifinals despite 26 points from Davis. He was named the 2015 Daily Advertiser All-Acadiana Most Valuable Player.

College career
Davis signed with Louisiana out of high school but was ruled ineligible. He played at San Jacinto Junior College for two seasons, missing part of his freshman season with an injured knee. He was named a NJCAA first-team All-American as a sophomore at San Jacinto, posting 17.4 points per game. Davis selected Houston over offers from Arizona, LSU, New Mexico State and Oklahoma State.

In his junior season, Davis helped Houston reach the NCAA Tournament for the second time since 1992, serving as the second-leading scorer to Rob Gray. He posted 13.1 points per game as a junior. As a senior, Davis averaged 17.1 points, 3.4 rebounds and 2.8 assists per game. He led Houston to the Sweet 16 of the NCAA Tournament. Davis was a unanimous selection to the First–team All-American Athletic Conference.

Professional career
After not being selected in the 2019 NBA draft, Davis signed with the Washington Wizards. On September 5, 2019, he signed with Afyon Belediye of the Turkish Basketball Super League (BSL). On June 6, 2020, Davis signed with BCM Gravelines-Dunkerque of the LNB Pro A. He averaged 13.4 points and 3.0 assists per game. Davis signed with KK Mornar Bar of the ABA League on July 19, 2021.

On December 9, 2021, he signed in the Italian Serie A with Pallacanestro Trieste.

Career statistics

College

|-
| style="text-align:left;"| 2017–18
| style="text-align:left;"| Houston
| 35 || 30 || 30.2 || .443 || .429 || .808 || 3.1 || 2.4 || .9 || .0 || 13.1
|-
| style="text-align:left;"| 2018–19
| style="text-align:left;"| Houston
| 37 || 36 || 33.1 || .420 || .375 || .869 || 3.3 || 2.8 || 1.0 || .1 || 17.0
|- class="sortbottom"
| style="text-align:center;" colspan="2"| Career
| 72 || 66 || 31.7 || .432 || .402 || .836 || 3.2 || 2.6 || 0.9 || .0 || 15.1

References

External links
Houston Cougars bio

1997 births
Living people
Afyonkarahisar Belediyespor players
American men's basketball players
Basketball players from Louisiana
Houston Cougars men's basketball players
Pallacanestro Trieste players
Point guards
San Jacinto Central Ravens men's basketball players
Sportspeople from Lafayette, Louisiana